The Faculty of Mathematics at the University of Cambridge comprises the Department of Pure Mathematics and Mathematical Statistics (DPMMS) and the Department of Applied Mathematics and Theoretical Physics (DAMTP). It is housed in the Centre for Mathematical Sciences site in West Cambridge, alongside the Isaac Newton Institute. Many distinguished mathematicians have been members of the faculty.

Some current members

DPMMS
Béla Bollobás
John Coates
Thomas Forster
Timothy Gowers
Peter Johnstone
Imre Leader
Gabriel Paternain

Statistical Laboratory
John Aston
Geoffrey Grimmett
Frank Kelly
Ioannis Kontoyiannis
Richard Nickl
James Norris
Richard Samworth
David Spiegelhalter
Richard Weber

DAMTP
Gary Gibbons
 Julia Gog, professor of mathematical biology
 Raymond E. Goldstein
Rich Kerswell
Paul Linden
Michael Green
Peter Haynes, fluid dynamicist
John Hinch, fluid dynamicist, retired 2014 
Richard Jozsa
Hugh Osborn
John Papaloizou
Malcolm Perry
David Tong, theoretical physicist
Paul Townsend
Grae Worster, editor for the Journal of Fluid Mechanics
Mihaela van der Schaar
Carola-Bibiane Schönlieb

Pure Mathematics and Mathematical Statistics
The Department of Pure Mathematics and Mathematical Statistics (DPMMS) was created in 1964 under the headship of Sir William Hodge.  It was housed in a converted warehouse at 16 Mill Lane, adjacent to its sister department DAMTP, until its move around 2000 to the present Centre for Mathematical Sciences where it occupies Pavilions C, D, and E.

Heads of department
1964–1969 W. V. D. Hodge
1969–1984 J. W. S. Cassels
1984–1991 D. J. H. Garling
1991–1997 John H. Coates
1997–2002 W. B. R. Lickorish
2002–2007 Geoffrey Grimmett
2007–2014 Martin Hyland
2014–2018 Gabriel Paternain
2018– James Norris

Statistical Laboratory
The Statistical Laboratory is a Sub-Department of DPMMS. It was created in 1947 with accommodation in a "temporary hut", and was established on 21 March 1953 within the Faculty of Mathematics. It moved in 1958 to the basement of the new Chemistry Department in Lensfield Road, and then formed part of the new Department (DPMMS) in Mill Lane on its creation in 1964. It occupies Pavilion D of the Centre for Mathematical Sciences.

Directors of the Statistical Laboratory
1953–1956 John Wishart
1956–1957 Henry Daniels, Acting Director
1957–1960 Dennis Lindley
1960–1962 Morris Walker, Acting Director
1962–1973 David Kendall
1973–1987 Peter Whittle
1987–1991 David Williams
1991–1993 Frank Kelly
1994–2000 Geoffrey Grimmett
2000–2009 Richard Weber
2009–2017 James Norris
2017– Richard Samworth

Applied Mathematics and Theoretical Physics

The Department of Applied Mathematics and Theoretical Physics (DAMTP) was founded by George Batchelor in 1959, and for many years was situated on Silver Street, in the former office buildings of Cambridge University Press. Currently, the Department is located at the Centre for Mathematical Sciences (Cambridge). Theoretical Physics (including cosmology, relativity, and high energy physics) occupies most of Pavilion B, while Applied Mathematics (including fluid dynamics and solid mechanics) occupies most of Pavilions F, G, and H.

Heads of department
1959–1983 George Batchelor
1983–1991 Keith Moffatt
1991–2000 David Crighton
2000–2005 Timothy J. Pedley
2005–2015 Peter Haynes
2015–2020 Nigel Peake
2020– Colm-Cille Patrick Caulfield

See also
Mathematical Tripos
Wrangler (University of Cambridge)
List of Cambridge mathematicians
Chairs associated with the Faculty:
Lucasian Professor of Mathematics
Lowndean Professor of Astronomy and Geometry
Rouse Ball Professor of Mathematics
Sadleirian Professor of Pure Mathematics
Herchel Smith Professorship of Pure Mathematics
Professorship of Mathematical Statistics
Churchill Professorship of Mathematics for Operational Research
Professorship of Statistical Science
Winton Professorship of the Public Understanding of Risk

References

External links

On Google maps
Pure Mathematics and Mathematical Statistics website
Statistical Laboratory website
Applied Mathematics and Theoretical Physics website
Cambridge Centre for Analysis website

 
Mathematics, Faculty of
Mathematics departments in the United Kingdom
Theoretical physics institutes